1964 presidential election may refer to:

 1964 Central African Republic presidential election
 1964 Chilean presidential election
 1964 Icelandic presidential election
 1964 United States presidential election